Jour J (English: D-day) is an ongoing French alternate history anthology comic book series published by Delcourt. Each volume presents a different what if history scenario in which a major historical event either don't not happen or takes a drastically different direction than what actually happened in our world.

For the most part each volume is a stand-alone story with the exceptions of volumes 3 and 4 which follow each other, volumes 14, 18 and 21 which together form a trilogy, volumes 22 and 24, volumes 23 and 28, volumes 26 and 34, volumes 29, 30 and 31, volumes 32 and 33, volumes 37, 39, 41, volumes 38 and 40, volumes 42 to 44 and finally Volume 46 and 47. Each story is illustrated by a different artist.

In July 2015 Delcourt made a exclusivity deal with Amazon to translate and publish 150 Delcourt titles into English and publish them on ComiXology with Jour J being one of those titles. The series would be renamed to "What if" for an English audience, with only 2 issues of Jour J being officially publish into English as of 2022 (Issue No. 1 & Issue No. 5).

Publication

Volumes

Special Edition 
Some Volumes have seen special edition rerelease which features some re-edits and added more information on the historical background of the Volumes.

 Special edition of volume 01 – "The Russians on the Moon! – Special Edition" (24 April 2019)
 Special edition of volumes 3 and 4 – "The Russian Revolution – Special edition" (13 September 2017)
 Special edition of volume 6 – "May 68 – Special edition" (14 March 2018)
 Special edition of volume 29, 30 and 31 – "September 11 – Special edition" (16 June 2021)

Inconsistencies
In the Issue No. 13 "Colombus Pacha", we see Pocahontas appear although she is supposed to be born a century later.

References

External links
 Jour J at Delcourt.com